Pasteurella dagmatis is a Gram-negative, nonmotile, penicillin-sensitive coccobacillus of the family Pasteurellaceae. Bacteria from this family cause zoonotic infections in humans. These infections manifest themselves as skin or soft tissue infections after an animal bite. It has been known to cause serious disease in immunocompromised patients.

See also
 Pasteurella anatis
 Pasteurella canis
 Pasteurella langaa
 Pasteurella stomatis
 Wound licking
 The VetBact database

References

External links
 Animal bite infections (healthAtoZ.com)
 VetBact.org entry
 Bacterio entry
 Type strain of Pasteurella dagmatis at BacDive -  the Bacterial Diversity Metadatabase

Bacterial diseases
Zoonoses
Pasteurellales
Bacteria described in 1985